The Bristol Harbour Railway (known originally as the Harbour Railway)  was a standard-gauge industrial railway that served the wharves and docks of Bristol, England. Freight could be transported directly by waggons to Paddington Station in London. The railway officially closed in 1964.

In 1978, a heritage railway named the Bristol Harbour Railway was opened and operated by Bristol Industrial Museum. The line is a very popular visitor attraction in the city.

Industrial line

The Harbour Railway was a joint venture by the GWR and sister company the Bristol and Exeter Railway. The first part of the network opened in 1872 between Temple Meads and the Floating Harbour. The route required a tunnel under St Mary Redcliffe church and a steam-powered bascule bridge across the entrance locks at Bathurst Basin.

In 1897 a Private Act of Parliament gave the GWR the authorisation to make a westwards connection between the Harbour Railway and the Portishead Railway. The connection also permitted the double the rail capacity to the Great Western Main Line.

In 1906 another authorised extension created new branches from the south via the Ashton Swing Bridge to Canons Marsh on the north side of the Floating Harbour and to Wapping via a line alongside the New Cut.

In 1964, the Harbour railway connection to Temple Meads was closed and the track lifted. The steam engine from the link's bascule bridge is now preserved at Bristol Museum. The following year, the Canons Marsh line closed. The branch from the Portishead line and Wapping marshalling yard to the Western Fuel Company continued remained open for commercial coal traffic for another 20 years. It was officially closed in 1987.

Heritage railway
In 1978, the Bristol Industrial Museum reopened part of the line as preserved railway using locomotives built in Bristol and formerly used at Avonmouth Docks. At first, it connected the museum with the SS Great Britain, but when commercial rail traffic ceased in 1987 on the remaining branch line, the museum railway expanded to use the branch alongside the New Cut. However, when the Portishead Railway was relaid, this severed the connection to Ashton Junction.

The line starts at M shed, following the south side of the harbour and crossing Spike Island, the narrow strip of land between the harbour and the River Avon.
The former route east over the Swing Bridge is now the Pill Pathway rail trail and cycleway.

In 2006, Bristol Industrial Museum was closed and the site redeveloped into M Shed Museum of Bristol. The railway continues to operate between SS Great Britain Halt and the CREATE Centre, and in 2011 the railway became part of M Shed's working exhibits.

In 2010, Bristol City Council, in partnership with other local councils in the area, proposed that the route of the railway should be used for a bus rapid transit route to serve the south-west of the city. In early 2013, a review of alternative routes recommended a route along Cumberland Road, Commercial Road and Redcliff Hill as the best alternative. This change of route means that the rapid transit buses would no longer use the railway.

Currently (March 2017) the track and platform at Butterfly Junction (by the CREATE Centre) has been removed due to work on the Bristol Metrobus system. Trains can only run from outside the M Shed as far as Vauxhall Bridge.

Rolling stock

There is also a collection of wagons, some of which have been converted for passenger use while others are used for demonstration goods trains.

References

Sources 
New page for M Shed Museum 
Old version of the museum's web page, now located at 
Unofficial behind the scenes blog on Bristol Harbour Railway

External links 

Bristol Industrial Museum
 
 

Bristol Harbourside
Grade II listed buildings in Bristol
Heritage railways in Bristol
Railway museums in England